Holywells Ward is a ward in the South East Area of Ipswich, Suffolk, England. It returns three councillors to Ipswich Borough Council.

It is designated Middle Layer Super Output Area Ipswich 011 by the Office of National Statistics. It is composed of 5 Lower Layer Super Output Areas.

The ward includes:
Holywells Park
 Part of Ipswich Waterfront

Councillors
The following councillors were elected since the boundaries were changed in 2002. Names in brackets indicates that the councillor remained in office without re-election.

Councillor Jan Parry, who was elected in May 2018, became Mayor of Ipswich in 2019. She continued until January 2021, when she resigned for unexplained reasons.

Councillor Elizabeth Harsant led the Council between 2004 and 2011.

References

Wards of Ipswich
South East Area, Ipswich